The 2011 St Edmundsbury Borough Council election took place on 5 May 2011 to elect members of St Edmundsbury Borough Council in England. This was on the same day as other local elections.

Summary

|}

References

2011 English local elections
May 2011 events in the United Kingdom
2011
2010s in Suffolk